Dejan Vukčević (born 9 December 1982) is a Montenegrin martial artist who represents his native country Montenegro in sport jujitsu and at the amateur level in judo. 

He is by profession a member of a Special Anti-terrorist Unit. On 11 December 2018, upon winning the 2018 World Seniors Championship in Malmo, Sweden, he was awarded the gold medal by the then sports minister Nikola Janović.

Nicknamed Golijat for his huge frame, he began with judo as a child. However, he has never reached the highest international level in this Olympic sport. 

In 2009, his home city Podgorica hosted the European championships in sport jujitsu, and he was part of the Montenegrin ju-jitsu team for the first time at age 27. Under coach Miloš Ašanin he soon became one of the best jutsukas in the heavyweight category. 

He is a three-time individual world champion – 2015, 2017, and 2018 in discipline fighting system, +94 kg weight category.

References

1982 births
Living people
Montenegrin martial artists
World Games bronze medalists
Competitors at the 2017 World Games